The 13th congressional district of Illinois is currently represented by Democrat Nikki Budzinski.

Redistricting

2020 redistricting
Following the 2020 census and the subsequent redistricting cycle, the 13th congressional district was significantly altered to include sections of the cities of Champaign, Springfield, and the Metro East of St. Louis. All of Macoupin County, and sections of Champaign, Macon, Madison, Piatt, Sangamon, and St. Clair Counties, are included in the new 13th. The redistricting turned the 13th district from a fairly even district to a more heavily Democratic-leaning one, and consequently it voted for a Democratic representative for the first time since 1892.

Recent statewide election results 
In the 2004 United States presidential election, this district voted for George W. Bush over John Kerry, 55% to 45%. However, in 2008 the district flipped and voted for Barack Obama in an almost reversed result from the previous election.

Recent election results

2012

2014

The Republican and Democratic primaries took place on March 18, 2014. In the Republican primary, incumbent Rodney L. Davis defeated fellow Republicans Erika Harold and Michael Firsching. In the Democratic primary, Ann Callis defeated George Gollin and David Green. Bill Byrnes had previously withdrawn from the Democratic primary. Josh Dill ran in the district as an Independent.

2016

2018

2020

2022

List of members representing the district

Historical district boundaries

See also
Illinois's congressional districts
List of United States congressional districts

References
Specific

General

 Congressional Biographical Directory of the United States 1774–present

External links
U.S. Census Bureau – 13th District Fact Sheet
 Ann Callis 2014 Democratic candidate – Campaign Site
David Green 2014 Democratic candidate – Campaign Site
 Rodney Davis Incumbent Republican – Campaign Site
 

13
Constituencies established in 1863
1863 establishments in Illinois